Acleris recula is a species of moth of the family Tortricidae. It is found in China (Zhejiang).

References

Moths described in 1974
recula
Moths of Asia